Mohammad Asghar Stanikzai, is a former Afghan cricketer and former captain of the Afghanistan national cricket team. Asghar is a right-handed batsman and a medium-fast bowler. In May 2018, he was named as the captain of Afghanistan, for their inaugural Test match, played against India. He made his Test debut for Afghanistan, against India, on 14 June 2018. On 2 August 2018, he changed his last name from Stanikzai to Afghan.

In April 2019, the Afghanistan Cricket Board (ACB) dropped him as captain of the Afghanistan team across all three formats. However, in December 2019, the ACB reappointed Asghar Stanikzai as the captain of the Afghanistan cricket team across all formats. In March 2021, during the series against Zimbabwe, Afghan played in his 50th T20I as a captain of Afghanistan. In May 2021, he was sacked from his role as the national team captain.

In October 2021, ahead of Afghanistan's match against Namibia in the 2021 ICC Men's T20 World Cup, Stanikzai announced his retirement from all forms of cricket following the game.

Early career
Stanikzai made his representative international debut for Afghanistan U-17s in the 2004 ACC Under-17 competition, where he played his debut match against the United Arab Emirates Under-17s. Stanikzai's debut match for the senior squad came against Oman in the 2004 ACC Trophy, as well as the 2006 ACC Trophy and the 2007 ACC Twenty20 Cup.

Stanikzai was a member of the Afghanistan side, that from 2008 to 2009 won the World Cricket League Division Five, Division Four and Division Three, earning them promotion to Division Two and allowing them to take part in the 2009 ICC World Cup Qualifier where they gained One Day International status.

In the World Cup Qualifier, Stanikzai made his List-A debut for Afghanistan against Bermuda and later in the tournament he made his One Day International debut against Scotland. His first-class debut came in Intercontinental Cup against a Zimbabwe XI in which Afghanistan drew the match. To date, Afghan has played in 4 first-class matches for Afghanistan. Later, in November 2009 he was a member of Afghanistan's 2009 ACC Twenty20 Cup winning squad.

Rising career
Afghan made his Twenty20 International debut against Ireland in the 2010 Quadrangular Twenty20 Series in Sri Lanka. Later on in February 2010, Afghan played a single match in Afghanistan's victorious 2010 ICC World Twenty20 Qualifier, playing in the final against Ireland. Afghan was later named in Afghanistan's squad for the 2010 ICC World Twenty20.

In April 2010, Afghan was a key member of Afghanistan's 2010 ACC Trophy Elite winning squad which defeated Nepal in the final. Afghan ended the tournament as the third leading run scorer with 253 runs, including a score of 151 runs from 83 balls against Bhutan.

On March 1, 2014, Afghan's 90* helped Afghanistan team to register their win over Bangladesh which was their first win against test playing nations. He and Samiullah Shenwari put on a 164 runs partnership for the sixth wicket which is the fifth highest Partnership for the sixth wicket in the history of ODIs and the third highest ODI Partnership for Afghanistan.

In February 2018, he had his appendix removed, therefore missing the start of the 2018 Cricket World Cup Qualifier tournament.

In September 2018, he was named in Kandahar's squad in the first edition of the Afghanistan Premier League tournament. He was the leading run-scorer for the Kandahar Knights in the tournament, with 264 runs in eight matches.

In April 2019, he was named in Afghanistan's squad for the 2019 Cricket World Cup. The following month, in the ODI series against Scotland, he became the second cricketer for Afghanistan to play in 100 ODI matches. In September 2021, he was named in Afghanistan's squad for the 2021 ICC Men's T20 World Cup.

References

External links

1987 births
Living people
Pashtun people
Cricketers from Kabul
Afghan cricketers
Afghanistan Test cricketers
Afghanistan One Day International cricketers
Afghanistan Twenty20 International cricketers
Asian Games medalists in cricket
Cricketers at the 2010 Asian Games
Cricketers at the 2015 Cricket World Cup
Cricketers at the 2019 Cricket World Cup
Asian Games silver medalists for Afghanistan
Medalists at the 2010 Asian Games
Kandahar Knights cricketers
Afghan cricket captains